William Jackson (15 July 1902 — November 1974) was an English professional footballer who played as a winger.

Career
Jackson started his career with non-league sides Leyland, Altrincham and Darwen before joining Football League club Sunderland. He was unable to break into the first team but eventually made his professional debut for Leeds United the following year. He began the 1925–26 season as first choice before losing his place to Tom Mitchell. After a season as cover, he moved to West Ham United but made only two appearances, both against Sheffield United, before leaving for Chelsea in February 1928.

He spent the longest period of his career with Chelsea, remaining with the club until December 1931, despite being largely used as a reserve player. He left Chelsea to join Leicester City but made just four appearances and was fined by the club after fighting with a reserve team player. He signed for Cardiff City in 1934 but after starting the season in the first team, he was displaced by Freddie Hill. He finished his professional career with a brief spell with Watford before playing non-league football with Chorley and Netherfield.

References

1902 births
1974 deaths
English footballers
Leyland F.C. players
Altrincham F.C. players
Sunderland A.F.C. players
Leeds United F.C. players
West Ham United F.C. players
Chelsea F.C. players
Leicester City F.C. players
Bristol Rovers F.C. players
Cardiff City F.C. players
Watford F.C. players
Chorley F.C. players
English Football League players
Association football wingers